Hanna Sandström (born 15 August 1995) is a Swedish footballer who played for Kristianstads DFF and Umeå IK.

References

External links 
 

1995 births
Living people
Swedish women's footballers
Umeå IK players
Damallsvenskan players
Women's association football midfielders
Kristianstads DFF players